The Giant Skyrocket was a wooden roller coaster designed and built by Audley Ingersoll in 1924 for the now defunct Luna Park in Houston Texas. The roller coaster is significant for a variety of reasons. It is one of the largest roller coasters ever built and was Houston's first major roller coaster. It was later relocated to Houston's Playland Park with involvement by John A. Miller and H. S. Smith before ultimately being closed in the early 1960s.

History 
The roller coaster was designed and fabricated at Lake Contrary Amusement Park in 1924 in St. Joseph, MO by Ingersoll before being shipped to Houston for assembly and construction.

It is an "in and out" design with a long flat stretch after leaving the platform until the first lift hill. It had a height of 110 feet and a 90-foot drop with pictures suggesting an exceedingly steep angle. It continued through three more hills until turning approximately 90 degrees left and following a series of hills and turns before returning to the platform to form an 'L' layout. A second lift hill has been suggested in its original configuration but not confirmed. The length was stated to be "a mile and a quarter" or 6,600 feet. At the time of its opening it was reportedly the largest roller coaster in the United States.

Luna Park 
1924 - ca. 1932

While Luna Park, Houston Texas originally scheduled to open in May 1924, a storm damaged the park including the roller coaster which was still under construction. After final construction delays, the Giant Skyrocket opened to the public on Friday June 28, 1924, 3 days after the park itself had opened. The cost of construction was reported to be $75,000.

While the park changed owners and was renamed Venice Park, the roller coaster is believed to have operated until the park was finally closed some time in the early 1930s.

Playland Park 
1941 - ca. 1963

Playland Park, Houston, Texas opened in the early 1940s. Sometime in 1941, Playland Park undertook the project to relocate the nearby roller coaster to its final location. It is known that John A. Miller, a noted roller coaster designer, died in Houston in 1941 while working on a project. Playland credited H. S. Smith for its construction. Period photographs show the Playland Park coaster to not have retained the full coaster as it was apparently modified and shortened though specific dimensions are not available.

The roller coaster opened September 5, 1941. It was advertised as the "largest roller coaster in the South". Playland appears to have only referred to it as the "Giant Roller Coaster". However local residents generally continued to refer to it as "The Skyrocket".

While the park remained open, the roller coaster ceased operations sometime between 1962 and 1964. By 1964 it was partially removed to make room for a new commercial building. By 1973 only an empty lot remained.

Accidents 
In October 1924 two passengers were killed from a fall. In 1962 a passenger fell and was seriously injured.

Legacy 

By 1964 the roller coaster had been partially removed at the turn hill. This portion of land had been sold by Playland Park and a new commercial building was constructed at what would become 2525 Murworth Drive. By 1973 only an empty lot remained.

Built during the original Golden Era of wooden coaster design, the Giant Skyrocket is one of the few that survived well beyond the Great Depression albeit in a shortened form at a new location. Today the Giant Skyrocket along with both parks is generally forgotten or sometimes confused with another roller coaster (The Rocket, located at a different the Playland Park in San Antonio, Texas in the 1940s).

It was ultimately succeeded in the Houston area by the Texas Cyclone at AstroWorld in 1976. Coincidentally, prior to constructing the Texas Cyclone, AstroWorld considered relocating an existing wooden roller coaster to Houston in the early 1970s.

References